Travis Michael Head (born 29 December 1993) is an Australian international cricketer. He is contracted to South Australia and the Adelaide Strikers for domestic matches. He is a left-handed middle-order batsman and a part-time right arm off-spin bowler. He was formerly a co vice-captain of the Australian national team in Tests from January 2019 to November 2020.

Head had an early start to his career, making his first-class debut at the age of 18 and representing Australia in the 2012 Under-19 Cricket World Cup. He kept his place in South Australia's Sheffield Shield side consistently and became the team's captain in 2015.

Early career (2011–2014)

From Adelaide, where Head played at underage levels for the Craigmore Cricket Club and Trinity College, Head represented South Australia at both under-17 and under-19 level, making his debut in the National Under-19 Championships at the age of 17. After making his name playing grade cricket for Tea Tree Gully Cricket Club, Head made his first-class cricket debut for South Australia in the Sheffield Shield at the age of 18 in early 2012. He made a promising start to his career with three matches for South Australia, scoring his maiden half-century in his second match and falling short of scoring his maiden century in his third match with 90 runs against Tasmania. He was rewarded at the end of the season with a rookie contract with South Australia.

Head went on to play 18 under-19 One Day International (ODI) matches for the Australian national team, including at the 2012 Under-19 Cricket World Cup. He impressed with both bat and ball during the tournament, scoring 87 off 42 balls against Scotland and taking three wickets against Bangladesh in the quarter-final. He showed leadership qualities when he captained South Australia to victory in the 2012–13 National Under-19 Championships, being named Player of the Championship for the second consecutive year.

Head remained a regular selection for the 2012–13 season, usually batting in the middle order. He came close to scoring his maiden century with 95 against Western Australia. Though he was not dismissed, he ran out of batting partners and was stranded at the crease five runs short of the milestone. He subsequently played a single Twenty20 game for the Adelaide Strikers in the Big Bash League, replacing the injured Kieron Pollard in the team. Shortly after South Australia's Shield win against Victoria in January 2013, he was hit by a car outside a hotel in Adelaide, receiving injuries to his head and back, but he made a full recovery and was able to return for South Australia's next match. Head was one of six young Australian players to be part of the inaugural Ageas Bowl International Cricket Academy during the 2013 season, training at the ground's facilities.

In the early part of Head's career, he struggled to reach his maiden first-class century, instead finishing with scores in the nineties on multiple occasions. After his score of 90 in his debut season and his unbeaten 95 against Western Australia in 2012, he made it to the nineties three times in the 2013–14 Sheffield Shield season, against Western Australia twice more and once against Tasmania with scores of 92, 98 and 98 respectively. Despite this he was able to score a List A century for the National Performance Squad against South Africa A in July 2014.

South Australian captaincy and international career (2015–present)

Limited-overs debut (2015–2016)
In February 2015, Head was named to replace Johan Botha as the captain of South Australia, though Botha stayed with the team for the rest of the season to assist with the transition. At the age of 21 he was the youngest captain of the South Australian side in their 122-year first-class history. As captain his fortunes continued to improve in the 2015–16 season as he shone in all three formats of the game. At the beginning of the season he became the third Australian in history to score a double century in a List A match with 202 runs from 120 balls. In doing so he helped South Australia to chase down the large target of 351 with three overs to spare. He also finally scored his maiden first-class century, after 17 scores of 50 or more, in a Sheffield Shield match against Western Australia to lead South Australia to a thrilling one-wicket win. On New Year's Eve he scored his maiden Twenty20 century against the Sydney Sixers, the first century ever scored for the Strikers. With three overs left in the match, the Strikers needed 51 runs to win and Head needed 55 runs to score his century. Head then scored 56 runs in the final three overs to score his century and win the match with three balls to spare, hitting Sean Abbott for three consecutive sixes in the last over. His final score was 101 runs off 53 balls with 9 sixes and 4 fours.

Head's form was rewarded by national selectors when he was included in Australia's squad for a series of Twenty20 Internationals against India. He made his international debut during the series on Australia Day at his home ground, the Adelaide Oval. After the series he returned to the Sheffield Shield, scoring two more centuries, one against Western Australia to secure another one-wicket win and the other against Tasmania, scoring a career-best 192 to help give South Australia an innings victory in just two days. He led South Australia to their first Sheffield Shield final in 20 years and was named the Sheffield Shield Player of the Year, having scored 699 runs at an average of 38.83 before the final, which South Australia lost.

Head was brought into Australia's One Day International (ODI) squad for the first time for a tri-series in the West Indies. He made his ODI debut on 13 June 2016 against the West Indies. After the tournament he joined the IPL team Royal Challengers Bangalore before going to England to play County cricket for Yorkshire. In his fourth match for Yorkshire he broke the club's record for the highest List A batting partnership, putting on 274 runs for the third wicket with Jack Leaning. Head scored 175 off 139 balls in the innings while Leaning also scored a century. He had to leave Yorkshire early when he was brought to Sri Lanka to train with Australia's Test squad and play in their ODI squad. Though he was originally not included in the squad, the selectors decided that they needed to give younger players more experience in Asian conditions after they had lost the first two matches of the Test series.

Opening stint and Champions Trophy (2016–2017)

As Head was part of Australia's squad for their tour of South Africa, he was unable to captain the Redbacks in the Matador Cup. He continued to play for Australia consistently in the 2016–17 season, but he was unable to make any big scores. Batting in the middle order, he regularly scored above 30 runs, doing so nine times in fourteen innings before the end of 2016, but he was only able to score three half-centuries with a high score of 57 against New Zealand. For Australia's series against Pakistan in January 2017, Head was moved from the middle order to the top order, opening the batting. This resulted in Head scoring his maiden ODI century against Pakistan on Australia Day at Adelaide Oval. He opened with David Warner and the pair scored 284 runs for the first wicket, with Head scoring 128 himself. This stands as the highest partnership for any wicket for Australia and the second highest opening stand in ODIs. Despite his strong form in One Day Internationals and in domestic cricket, averaging over 60 in the 2016–17 Sheffield Shield season, Head was not included in Australia's Test squad for the 2017 Border-Gavaskar Trophy, though the then Australian coach Darren Lehmann said "We expect him in the not-too-distant future to get his chance in Test cricket." Instead, Head continued to play for South Australia, who played in their second consecutive Sheffield Shield final. He scored a century but the Redbacks ultimately lost the match.

When limited overs opener Aaron Finch returned to form, Head was dropped back to the middle order, though he remained in the Australian side for the 2017 ICC Champions Trophy. Due to weather, neither of Australia's first two matches in the tournament were completed and Head did not get a chance to bat, but in Australia's only completed match, against hosts England, Head top scored for Australia with 71* in a losing effort. Head signed to play for Yorkshire again in the 2017 NatWest t20 Blast, but he pulled out of the tournament when he was named the captain of the Australia A side for the 2017 South Africa A Team Tri-Series. As a result of a pay dispute with Cricket Australia, the Australia A side pulled out of this tournament.

Head started the 2017–18 Sheffield Shield season as one of many players in contention to take Australia's number 6 spot in the upcoming Ashes against England. In the first match of the season the Redbacks played against New South Wales, whose bowling attack made up the entire Australian bowling attack. Head did not impress selectors, only scoring totals of 8 and 0, but he bounced back with an impressive, measured half-century against Victoria and a century against Queensland. Regardless, he did not earn selection in Australia's Test team.

When Brad Hodge left the Adelaide Strikers, Head replaced him as the team's captain, adding it to his captaincy of South Australia and making him the captain of the state's highest-level team in all three formats of the game.

List A cricket (2021)
In October 2021, Head made his second double century (230 off 127 deliveries), against Queensland in Adelaide, becoming the third batsman to score more than one double century in List A cricket.

Test cricket (2018–present)

In April 2018, Head was awarded a national contract by Cricket Australia for the 2018–19 season. In September 2018, he was named in Australia's Test squad for their series against Pakistan. He made his Test debut for Australia against Pakistan on 7 October 2018. He had his baggy green cap presented to him from Nathan Lyon.

In January 2019, Head was announced as Australia's new Test vice-captain, alongside Pat Cummins ahead of the series against Sri Lanka on 24 January. This was due to the unavailability of regular vice-captains, Mitchell Marsh who was omitted from the Test squad and Josh Hazlewood who was unavailable due to an injury. In the two-Test series, across three innings, Head scored 84, 161 (his maiden Test century), and 59 not out to raise his Test match batting average to 51.

In July 2019, Head was named in Australia's squad for the 2019 Ashes series in England. In November 2019, Head played against Pakistan in Australia, although he only batted once in the series. In December 2019, he was named in Australia's squad for the Test Series against New Zealand. He made a century (114) and was named player of the match in the second Test. On 16 July 2020, Head was named in a 26-man preliminary squad of players to begin training ahead of a possible tour to England following the COVID-19 pandemic.

In November 2020, despite being named in a 17-man squad for the Test series against India, Head was demoted as Australia's Test co vice-captain, with Pat Cummins to solely deputise Tim Paine.

Head was included in the squad for the 2021–22 Ashes. In the first test at The Gabba, he made his third century (152), and was named player of the match. Head was ruled out of the fourth test in Sydney after testing positive for COVID-19. He returned for the fifth test in Hobart, where he made another century (101). He was named player of the match, and was also awarded the Compton–Miller Medal for player of the series.

In February 2022, Head was included in the 18-man squad to tour Pakistan in March. Head was included in the squad for the 2022 tour of Sri Lanka. In the first Test in Galle, he picked up career best figures of 4/10 - his first wickets in Tests - in the second innings, paving the way for a 10-wicket victory for Australia.

Head was included in Australian squad for the series against the West Indies. In the first Test in Perth, he scored 99, putting on 196 runs for the fourth wicket with Steve Smith in the first innings. He took two wickets in the second innings, as Australia won by 164 runs. In the second Test in  Adelaide, Head scored a career-best 175 in the first innings, putting on 297 runs for the fourth wicket with Marnus Labuschagne. He won the player of the match award. He was included in the Australian squad for the home series against South Africa in 2022-23. In the first Test, Head top scored for Australia with 92 in the first innings, and he was named player of the match. He also completed 2000 runs in Tests. In the same week, Head moved to number four in the ICC rankings for Test batting, his best postition.

Head was included in the 18-man squad for the 2023 Border-Gavaskar series.

Limited-overs return (2022)
In January 2022, Head was included in the 16-man squad to face Sri Lanka in a five-match T20I series; he last played white ball cricket for Australia in 2018. In February, Cricket Australia announced that Head would miss the start of the series to play in  the Sheffield Shield, and would join the squad in Melbourne. He did not feature in any of the matches.

In February 2022, Head was included in the white-ball squad for the Pakistan tour. In the first ODI, his first since November 2018, he made his second century (101 off 72 deliveries) opening the batting, took two wickets and was named player of the match. He made 89 in the second ODI, but was dismissed for a golden duck in the final match. He made his T20I return in the one-off match.

Head was selected in the ODI and Australia A squads for the tour of Sri Lanka in June–July 2022. In the second unofficial ODI against Sri Lanka A, Head top scored with 110 in a losing cause. He was picked for the ODIs after injuries to several Australian players; he played in the second, third (where he top scored with 70 not out), and fourth matches, but was ruled out of the final match with a hamstring strain.

After missing the home series against Zimbabwe and New Zealand due to paternity leave, Head was included in the ODI squad to face England in November 2022, replacing the now-retired Aaron Finch as opener. In the final ODI in Melbourne, Head scored his third century, a career-best 152, and was awarded the player of the match award. Head and David Warner put on 269 runs, becoming the second pair to make two 250-run partnerships in ODIs, and joint fastest to score 1000 partnership runs.

Head was selected for the ODI series in India in March 2023. In the second ODI in Visakhapatnam, opening the batting with Mitchell Marsh, he scored a rapid unbeaten half-century, and put on an unbeaten partnership of 121 in 11 overs, as Australia cruised to victory by 10 wickets in a small chase.

Personal life
Head is engaged to Jessica Davies. Their first child, a daughter, was born in September 2022.

International centuries
, Head has scored five centuries in Tests and three in ODIs.

References

External links 
 

1993 births
Living people
Australian cricket captains
Sussex cricket captains
Adelaide Strikers cricketers
Australia Test cricketers
Australia One Day International cricketers
Australia Twenty20 International cricketers
Australian cricketers
Cricketers from South Australia
Royal Challengers Bangalore cricketers
South Australia cricketers
Sussex cricketers
Worcestershire cricketers
Yorkshire cricketers
Wicket-keepers